It is the 2021–22 season of the Women's Volleyball team of Galatasaray Sports Club.

Sponsorship and kit manufacturers

Supplier: Galatasaray Store
Name sponsor: HDI Sigorta
Main sponsor: HDI Sigorta and Tunç Holding 
Back sponsor: Qnet 

Sleeve sponsor: —
Lateral sponsor: GSMobile
Short sponsor: —
Socks sponsor: —

Technical Staff

Team roster

Transfers

New contracts

In

Out

Pre-season and friendlies
All times are Europe Time (UTC+03:00).																						

|}

Competitions

Turkish Women's Volleyball League (Misli.com Sultanlar Ligi)

League table

Regular season (1st Half)
All times are Europe Time (UTC+03:00).																						

|}

Regular season (2nd Half)
All times are Europe Time (UTC+03:00).																						

|}

Playoffs

5–8th place
All times are Europe Time (UTC+03:00).																						

|}

5–6th place
All times are Europe Time (UTC+03:00).																						

|}

Turkish Women's Volleyball Cup (Axa Sigorta Kupa Voley)

Group B

|}

Results
All times are Europe Time (UTC+03:00).																						

|}

Quarter-finals
All times are Europe Time (UTC+03:00).																						

|}

References

External links
 Official Galatasaray Volleyball Branch Website 
 Galatasaray HDI Sigorta » players __ Women Volleybox.net 
 Turkish Volleyball Federastion Official Website 

Galatasaray S.K. (women's volleyball) seasons
Galatasaray Sports Club 2021–22 season